Abell 383 is a galaxy cluster in the Abell catalogue.

See also
 List of Abell clusters

References

383
Abell richness class 2
Active galaxies
Galaxy clusters
Eridanus (constellation)